Murray Income Trust is a large British investment trust dedicated to investments in UK equities. Established as the Caledonian Trust Company in 1923, it became the Murray Caledonian Investment Trust in 1979 and Murray Income Trust in 1984. It absorbed 80% of the assets of the Perpetual Income & Growth Investment Trust in November 2020. Originally managed by Murray Johnstone, it is now managed by abrdn. The Chairman is Neil Rogan. The company is listed on the London Stock Exchange and it is a constituent of the FTSE 250 Index.

References

External links
  Official site
 

Investment trusts of the United Kingdom